Hovea arnhemica, is a species of flowering plant in the family Fabaceae and is endemic to the Top End of the Northern Territory. It is a subshrub with light brown hairs, narrowly egg-shaped or elliptic leaves with stipules at the base, and mostly white, pea-like flowers.

Description

Taxonomy and naming
Hovea arnhemica was first formally described in 1989 by James Henderson Ross in the journal, Muelleria from specimens collected in Arnhem Land by C.R. Dunlop in 1984. The species had been collected by Allan Cunningham on 21 April 1818 at Port Essington when he accompanied Lieutenant King on the Mermaid.

Distribution and habitat
This species of pea grows in forest in Arnhem Land, north and north-west of Gunbalanya.

References

arnhemica
Flora of the Northern Territory
Fabales of Australia
Plants described in 1989